Mariappan Perumal is a former Malaysian Paralympic weightlifter. He won bronze at the 1988 Summer Paralympics and 1992 Summer Paralympics. He also  won Malaysia's first Paralympic medal.

References

External links 
 

Living people
Malaysian people of Indian descent
Malaysian male weightlifters
Malaysian powerlifters
Paralympic powerlifters of Malaysia
Paralympic bronze medalists for Malaysia
Weightlifters at the 1988 Summer Paralympics
Weightlifters at the 1992 Summer Paralympics
Medalists at the 1988 Summer Paralympics
Medalists at the 1992 Summer Paralympics
Paralympic medalists in weightlifting
1958 births
People from Malacca
20th-century Malaysian people
Medalists at the 2010 Asian Para Games